Saskatoon University is a provincial electoral district for the Legislative Assembly of Saskatchewan, Canada. Revived as a result of the 2013 revision of Saskatchewan's electoral districts, it was last contested in the 2020 election.

Saskatoon University was first created in 1971 and was in existence from 1971 to 1975 and again from 1982 to 1991. The district's first incarnation was merged into Saskatoon Centre in 1975 and its second incarnation was merged into Saskatoon Sutherland-University in 1991.

Members of the Legislative Assembly

Election results

Saskatoon University, 2016–present

References

External links 
Website of the Legislative Assembly of Saskatchewan

Saskatchewan provincial electoral districts
Politics of Saskatoon